Stealth aircraft are designed to avoid detection using a variety of technologies that reduce reflection/emission of radar, infrared, visible light, radio frequency (RF) spectrum, and audio, collectively known as stealth technology. The F-117 Nighthawk was the first operational aircraft specifically designed around stealth technology. Other examples of stealth aircraft include the  B-2 Spirit, the B-21 Raider, the F-22 Raptor, the F-35 Lightning II, the Chengdu J-20, and the Sukhoi Su-57.

While no aircraft is totally invisible to radar, stealth aircraft make it more difficult for conventional radar to detect or track the aircraft effectively, increasing the odds of an aircraft successfully avoiding detection by enemy radar and/or avoiding being successfully targeted by radar guided weapons. Stealth is the combination of passive low observable (LO) features and active emitters such as low-probability-of-intercept radars, radios and laser designators. These are usually combined with active measures such as carefully planning all mission maneuvers in order to minimize the aircraft's radar cross-section, since common actions such as hard turns or opening bomb bay doors can more than double an otherwise stealthy aircraft's radar return. It is accomplished by using a complex design philosophy to reduce the ability of an opponent's sensors to detect, track, or attack the stealth aircraft. This philosophy also takes into account the heat, sound, and other emissions of the aircraft as these can also be used to locate it. Sensors made to reduce the impact of current low observable technologies exist or have been proposed such as IRST (infrared search and track) systems to detect even reduced heat emissions, long wavelength radars to counter stealth shaping and RAM focused on shorter wavelength radar, or radar setups with multiple emitters to counter stealth shaping. However these do so with disadvantages compared to traditional radar against non-stealthy aircraft.

Full-size stealth combat aircraft demonstrators have been flown by the United States (in 1977), Russia (in 2000) and China (in 2011). , the only combat-ready stealth aircraft in service are the Northrop Grumman B-2 Spirit (1997), the Lockheed Martin F-22 Raptor (2005); the Lockheed Martin F-35 Lightning II (2015); the Chengdu J-20 (2017), and the Sukhoi Su-57 (2020), with a number of other countries developing their own designs. There are also various aircraft with reduced detectability, either unintentionally or as a secondary feature.

In the 1999 NATO bombing of Yugoslavia two stealth aircraft were used by the United States, the veteran F-117 Nighthawk, and the newly introduced B-2 Spirit strategic stealth bomber. The F-117 performed its usual role of striking precision high-value targets and performed well, although one F-117 was shot down by a Serbian Isayev S-125 'Neva-M' missile brigade commanded by Colonel Zoltán Dani.

Background

World War I and World War II

During World War I, the Germans experimented with the use of Cellon (Cellulose acetate), a transparent covering material, in an attempt to reduce the visibility of military aircraft. Single examples of the Fokker E.III Eindecker fighter monoplane, the Albatros C.I two-seat observation biplane, and the Linke-Hofmann R.I prototype heavy bomber were covered with Cellon. However, it proved ineffective, and even counterproductive, as sunlight glinting from the covering made the aircraft even more visible. The material was also found to be quickly degraded both by sunlight and in-flight temperature changes, so the attempt to make transparent aircraft was not proceeded with.

In 1916, the British modified a small SS class airship for the purpose of night-time aerial reconnaissance over German lines on the Western Front. Fitted with a silenced engine and a black gas bag, the craft was both invisible and inaudible from the ground, but several night-time flights over German-held territory produced little useful intelligence, and the idea was dropped.

Nearly three decades later, the Horten Ho 229 flying wing fighter-bomber, developed in Nazi Germany during the last years of World War II proved to have some stealth characteristics due to its lack of vertical surfaces (key characteristic of all stealth aircraft plus inherent feature of all flying wing aircraft like the Ho 229). Testing performed in 2008 by the Northrop-Grumman Corporation established that the aircraft's shape would have rendered the Ho 229 virtually invisible to the top-end HF-band, 20–30 MHz primary signals of Britain's Chain Home early warning radar, provided the aircraft was traveling at high speed (approximately ) at extremely low altitude – . Despite that, the Ho 229 was never intended to be a stealth aircraft.

Modern era
Modern stealth aircraft first became possible when Denys Overholser, a mathematician working for Lockheed Aircraft during the 1970s, adopted a mathematical model developed by Petr Ufimtsev, a Soviet scientist, to develop a computer program called Echo 1. Echo made it possible to predict the radar signature of an aircraft made with flat panels, called facets. In 1975, engineers at Lockheed Skunk Works found that an aircraft made with faceted surfaces could have a very low radar signature because the surfaces would radiate almost all of the radar energy away from the receiver. Lockheed built a proof of concept demonstrator aircraft, the Lockheed Have Blue, nicknamed "the Hopeless Diamond", a reference to the famous Hope Diamond and the design's shape and predicted instability. Because advanced computers were available to control the flight of an aircraft that was designed for stealth but aerodynamically unstable such as the Have Blue, for the first time designers realized that it might be possible to make an aircraft that was virtually invisible to radar.

Reduced radar cross section is only one of five factors the designers addressed to create a truly stealthy design such as the F-22. The F-22 has also been designed to disguise its infrared emissions to make it harder to detect by infrared homing ("heat seeking") surface-to-air or air-to-air missiles. Designers also addressed making the aircraft less visible to the naked eye, controlling radio transmissions, and noise abatement.

The first combat use of purpose-designed stealth aircraft was in December 1989 during Operation Just Cause in Panama. On 20 December 1989, two United States Air Force F-117s bombed a Panamanian Defense Force barracks in Rio Hato, Panama. In 1991, F-117s were tasked with attacking the most heavily fortified targets in Iraq in the opening phase of Operation Desert Storm and were the only jets allowed to operate inside Baghdad's city limits.

General design

The general design of a stealth aircraft is always aimed at reducing radar and thermal detection. It is the designer's top priority to satisfy the following conditions, which ultimately decide the success of the aircraft:

Reducing thermal emission from thrust
Reducing radar detection by altering some general configuration (like introducing the split rudder)
Reducing radar detection when the aircraft opens its weapons bay
Reducing infra-red and radar detection during adverse weather conditions

Limitations

Instability of design
Early stealth aircraft were designed with a focus on minimal radar cross section (RCS) rather than aerodynamic performance. Highly stealthy aircraft like the F-117 Nighthawk are aerodynamically unstable in all three axes and require constant flight corrections from a fly-by-wire (FBW) flight system to maintain controlled flight. As for the B-2 Spirit, which was based on the development of the flying wing aircraft by Jack Northrop in 1940, this design allowed for a stable aircraft with sufficient yaw control, even without vertical surfaces such as rudders.

Aerodynamic limitations
Earlier stealth aircraft (such as the F-117 and B-2) lack afterburners, because the hot exhaust would increase their infrared footprint, and flying faster than the speed of sound would produce an obvious sonic boom, as well as surface heating of the aircraft skin, which also increases the infrared footprint. As a result, their performance in air combat maneuvering required in a dogfight would never match that of a dedicated fighter aircraft.  This was unimportant in the case of these two aircraft since both were designed to be bombers. More recent design techniques allow for stealthy designs such as the F-22 without compromising aerodynamic performance. Newer stealth aircraft, like the F-22, F-35 and the Su-57, have performance characteristics that meet or exceed those of current front-line jet fighters due to advances in other technologies such as flight control systems, engines, airframe construction and materials.

Electromagnetic emissions
The high level of computerization and large amount of electronic equipment found inside stealth aircraft are often claimed to make them vulnerable to passive detection.  This is highly unlikely and certainly systems such as Tamara and Kolchuga, which are often described as counter-stealth radars, are not designed to detect stray electromagnetic fields of this type. Such systems are designed to detect intentional, higher power emissions such as radar and communication signals. Stealth aircraft are deliberately operated to avoid or reduce such emissions.

Current Radar Warning Receivers look for the regular pings of energy from mechanically swept radars while fifth generation jet fighters use Low Probability of Intercept Radars with no regular repeat pattern.

Vulnerable modes of flight
Stealth aircraft are still vulnerable to detection while and immediately after using their weaponry. Since stealth payload (reduced RCS bombs and cruise missiles) is not yet generally available, and ordnance mount points create a significant radar return, stealth aircraft carry all armaments internally. As soon as weapons bay doors are opened, the plane's RCS will be multiplied and even older generation radar systems will be able to locate the stealth aircraft. While the aircraft will reacquire its stealth as soon as the bay doors are closed, a fast response defensive weapons system has a short opportunity to engage the aircraft.

This vulnerability is addressed by operating in a manner that reduces the risk and consequences of temporary acquisition. The B-2's operational altitude imposes a flight time for defensive weapons that makes it virtually impossible to engage the aircraft during its weapons deployment. New stealth aircraft designs such as the F-22 and F-35 can open their bays, release munitions and return to stealthy flight in less than a second.

Some weapons require that the weapon's guidance system acquire the target while the weapon is still attached to the aircraft. This forces relatively extended operations with the bay doors open.

Such aircraft as the F-22 Raptor and F-35 Lightning II Joint Strike Fighter can also carry additional weapons and fuel on hardpoints below their wings.  When operating in this mode the planes will not be nearly as stealthy, as the hardpoints and the weapons mounted on those hardpoints will show up on radar systems.  This option therefore represents a trade off between stealth or range and payload.  External stores allow those aircraft to attack more targets further away, but will not allow for stealth during that mission as compared to a shorter range mission flying on just internal fuel and using only the more limited space of the internal weapon bays for armaments.

Reduced payload

Fully stealth aircraft carry all fuel and armament internally, which limits the payload. By way of comparison, the F-117 carries only two laser- or GPS-guided bombs, while a non-stealth attack aircraft can carry several times more. This requires the deployment of additional aircraft to engage targets that would normally require a single non-stealth attack aircraft.  This apparent disadvantage however is offset by the reduction in fewer supporting aircraft that are required to provide air cover, air-defense suppression and electronic counter measures, making stealth aircraft "force multipliers".

Sensitive skin

Stealth aircraft often have skins made with radiation-absorbent materials or RAMs. Some of these contain carbon black particles, while some contain tiny iron spheres. There are many materials used in RAMs, and some are classified, particularly the materials that specific aircraft use.

Cost of operations
Stealth aircraft are typically more expensive to develop and manufacture. An example is the B-2 Spirit that is many times more expensive to manufacture and support than conventional bomber aircraft. The B-2 program cost the U.S. Air Force almost $45 billion.

Countermeasures

Reflected waves

Passive (multistatic) radar, bistatic radar and especially multistatic radar systems detect some stealth aircraft better than conventional monostatic radars, since first-generation stealth technology (such as the F117) reflects energy away from the transmitter's line of sight, effectively increasing the radar cross section (RCS) in other directions, which the passive radars monitor. Such a system typically uses either low frequency broadcast TV and FM radio signals (at which frequencies controlling the aircraft's signature is more difficult).

Researchers at the University of Illinois at Urbana–Champaign with support of DARPA, have shown that it is possible to build a synthetic aperture radar image of an aircraft target using passive multistatic radar, possibly detailed enough to enable automatic target recognition.

In December 2007, SAAB researchers revealed details for a system called Associative Aperture Synthesis Radar (AASR) that would employ a large array of inexpensive and redundant transmitters and receivers that could detect targets when they directly pass between the receivers/transmitters and create a shadow. The system was originally designed to detect stealthy cruise missiles and should be just as effective against low-flying stealth aircraft. That the array could contain a large amount of inexpensive equipment could potentially offer some "protection" against attacks by expensive anti-radar (or anti-radiation) missiles.

Infrared (heat)

Some analysts claim Infra-red search and track systems (IRSTs) can be deployed against stealth aircraft, because any aircraft surface heats up due to air friction and with a two channel IRST is a  (4.3 µm absorption maxima) detection possible, through difference comparing between the low and high channel. These analysts point to the resurgence in such systems in Russian designs in the 1980s, such as those fitted to the MiG-29 and Su-27. The latest version of the MiG-29, the MiG-35, is equipped with a new Optical Locator System that includes more advanced IRST capabilities. The French Rafale, the British/German/Italian/Spanish Eurofighter and the Swedish Gripen also make extensive use of IRST.

In air combat, the optronic suite allows:
 Detection of non-afterburning targets at  range and more;
 Identification of those targets at  range; and

For ground targets, the suite allows:

Longer wavelength radar

VHF radar systems have wavelengths comparable to aircraft feature sizes and should exhibit scattering in the resonance region rather than the optical region, allowing most stealth aircraft to be detected. This has prompted Nizhny Novgorod Research Institute of Radio Engineering (NNIIRT) to develop VHF AESAs such as the NEBO SVU, which is capable of performing target acquisition for Surface-to-air missile batteries. Despite the advantages offered by VHF radar, their longer wavelengths result in poor resolution compared to comparably sized X band radar array. As a result, these systems must be very large before they can have the resolution for an engagement radar. An example of a ground-based VHF radar with counter-stealth capability is the P-18 radar.

The Dutch company Thales Nederland, formerly known as Holland Signaal, developed a naval phased-array radar called SMART-L, which is operated at L Band and has counter-stealth. All ships of the Royal Dutch Navy's De Zeven Provinciën class carry, among others, the SMART-L radar.

OTH radar (over-the-horizon radar)
Over-the-horizon radar is a concept increasing radar's effective range over conventional radar. The Australian JORN Jindalee Operational Radar Network can overcome certain stealth characteristics.  It is claimed that the HF frequency used and the method of bouncing radar from ionosphere overcomes the stealth characteristics of the F-117A.  In other words, stealth aircraft are optimized for defeating much higher-frequency radar from front-on rather than low-frequency radars from above.

Operational stealth aircraft

The U.S, UK, and Israel are the only countries to have used stealth aircraft in combat. These deployments include the United States invasion of Panama, the first Gulf War, the Kosovo Conflict, the War in Afghanistan, the War in Iraq and the 2011 military intervention in Libya. The first use of stealth aircraft was in the U.S. invasion of Panama, where F-117 Nighthawk stealth attack aircraft were used to drop bombs on enemy airfields and positions while evading enemy radar.

In 1990 the F-117 Nighthawk was used in the First Gulf War, where F-117s flew 1,300 sorties and scored direct hits on 1,600 high-value targets in Iraq while accumulating 6,905 flight hours. Only 2.5% of the American aircraft in Iraq were F-117s, yet they struck 40% of the strategic targets, dropping 2,000 tons of precision-guided munitions and striking their targets with an 80% success rate.

In the 1999 NATO bombing of Yugoslavia two stealth aircraft were used by the United States: the veteran F-117 Nighthawk, and the newly introduced B-2 Spirit strategic stealth bomber. The F-117 performed its usual role of striking precision high-value targets and performed well, although one F-117 was shot down by a Serbian Isayev S-125 'Neva-M' missile commanded by Colonel Zoltán Dani. The then-new B-2 Spirit was highly successful, destroying 33% of selected Serbian bombing targets in the first eight weeks of U.S. involvement in the War. During this war, B-2s flew non-stop to Kosovo from their home base in Missouri and back.

In the 2003 invasion of Iraq, F-117 Nighthawks and B-2 Spirits were used, and this was the last time the F-117 would see combat. F-117s dropped satellite-guided strike munitions on selected targets, with high success. B-2 Spirits conducted 49 sorties in the invasion, releasing 1.5 million pounds of munitions.

During the May 2011 operation to kill Osama bin Laden, one of the helicopters used to clandestinely insert U.S. troops into Pakistan crashed in the bin Laden compound.  From the wreckage it was revealed this helicopter had stealth characteristics, making this the first publicly known operational use of a stealth helicopter. 

Stealth aircraft were used in the 2011 military intervention in Libya, where B-2 Spirits dropped 40 bombs on a Libyan airfield with concentrated air defenses in support of the UN no-fly zone.

Stealth aircraft will continue to play a valuable role in air combat with the United States using the F-22 Raptor, B-2 Spirit, and the F-35 Lightning II to perform a variety of operations. The F-22 made its combat debut over Syria in September 2014 as part of the US-led coalition to defeat ISIS.

From February 2018, Su-57s performed the first international flight as they were spotted landing at the Russian Khmeimim Air Base in Syria. These Su-57s were deployed along with four Sukhoi Su-35 fighters, four Sukhoi Su-25s, and one Beriev A-50 AEW&C aircraft. It is believed that at least 4 Su-57 are deployed in Syria and that they have likely been armed with cruise missiles in combat.

In 2018, a report surfaced noting that Israeli F-35I stealth fighters conducted a number of missions in Syria and even infiltrated Iranian airspace without detection. In May 2018, Major General Amikam Norkin of IAF reported that Israeli Air Force F-35I stealth fighters carried out the first-ever F-35 strike in combat over Syria.

The People's Republic of China started flight testing its Chengdu J-20 stealth multirole fighter around in 2011 and made its first public appearance at Airshow China 2016. The aircraft entered service with the People's Liberation Army Air Force (PLAAF) in March 2017. Another fifth-generation stealth multirole fighter from China, the Shenyang FC-31 is also under flight testing.

List of stealth aircraft

In service
B-2 Spirit - (United States)
F-22 Raptor - (United States)
F-35 Lightning II - (United States)
Chengdu J-20 – (China)
Sukhoi Su-57 – (Russia)

Retired
F-117 Nighthawk – (United States)
SR-71 Blackbird – (United States)

Under development
Shenyang J-35 – (China)
Xian H-20 – (China)
PAK DP – (Russia)
PAK DA – (Russia) 
 Sukhoi Su-75 – (Russia)
F/A-XX – (United States)
Next Generation Air Dominance – (United States)
B-21 Raider – (United States)
AMCA – (India)
BAE Systems Tempest – (United Kingdom)
Global Combat Air Programme – (United Kingdom / Japan / Italy)
New Generation Fighter – (France / Germany / Spain)
Flygsystem 2020 – (Sweden)
KAI KF-21 – (South Korea / Indonesia)
TAI TFX – (Turkey)

Canceled
A-12 Avenger II – (United States)
853 Quiet Bird – (United States)
 X-44 MANTA – (United States)
 Lockheed FB-22 – (United States)
Mikoyan MiG LMFS – (Russia)
Mikoyan MiG 4.12 - (Russia)
Yakovlev Yak-201 - (Russia) 
BAE Systems Replica – (United Kingdom)
 EADS Mako – (Germany) 
MBB Lampyridae – (Germany)
RAH-66 Comanche – (United States)

Technology demonstrators
 Bird of Prey – (United States) 
Have Blue – (United States) 
McDonnell Douglas X-36 – (United States)
Northrop Tacit Blue – (United States)
Windecker YE-5 – (United States) 
YF-22 – (United States)
YF-23 Black Widow II – (United States) 
X-35 – (United States) 
X-32 – (United States) 
MiG 1.44 – (Soviet Union) 
 Mitsubishi X-2 – (Japan)

Stealth UAV

In service 
Lockheed Martin RQ-170 Sentinel – (United States)
Northrop Grumman RQ-180 – (United States)
Sharp Sword – (China)
Wind Shadow – (China)

Under development 
Sukhoi Okhotnik – (Russia)
 MQ-28 Ghost Bat - (Australia)
Baykar Bayraktar Kızılelma - (Turkey)
MiG Skat – (Russia)
BAE Systems Taranis – (United Kingdom)
DRDO Ghatak – (India)

Technology demonstrators 
Lockheed Martin X-44 (UAV) – (United States)
Northrop Grumman X-47A – (United States)
Northrop Grumman X-47B – (United States)
Sagitta Research Demonstrator – (Germany)
Dassault nEUROn – (France)
DRDO SWiFT(INDIA)
Boeing MQ-25 Stingray – (United States)
Boeing X-45 – (United States)
Kratos XQ-58 Valkyrie – (United States) 
Ryan AQM-91 Firefly – (United States)
BAE Systems Corax – (United Kingdom)

See also

Metamaterial

References

Bibliography